DTK Computer is the name for international branches of Datatech Enterprises, a Taiwanese computer manufacturer. Founded in 1981, the company was an early supplier of peripherals for IBM PCs as well as PC compatible motherboards. In the late 1980s, the company switched to developing complete systems under the DTK name as well as serving as an OEM for motherboards and cases, as bought by other small computer companies and systems integrators. The company was little-known in its own time but performed well in the marketplace. DTK was the 10th and 11th biggest personal computer manufacturer in the world in 1991 and 1992 respectively, according to Electronics magazine.

History

Foundation and expansion (1981–1989)
Datatech Enterprises was established in Taipei, Taiwan, in 1981. The company was founded by eight employees with US$15,000 in start-up capital; in 1982, Datatech raised an additional US$337,000 in capital and expanded to 24 employees. Datatech's president Duke Liao founded the company's United States branch in 1986. This branch was named DTK Computer and was initially headquartered in Rosemead, California. In 1989, DTK moved their headquarters to the City of Industry in California to afford more space for its warehouse of products and to lessen the driving distance for most of its employee base, which in 1993 comprised 100 employees.

Datatech employed 1,000 people globally in 1989. Its research and development lab in Taiwan grew from 45 employees to 72 that year. Employees worked from eight to ten hours on weekdays and four hours on Saturdays. The workplace environment in Taiwan was relatively progressive for the time, with only a single layer of management between engineers and the company presidents, management allowing capable engineers to fully experiment in their departments, and flexible hours with a two-hour grace period for employees' nominal starting times and no punch clock. The R&D lab was cramped for space, however, with workbenches and two-by-four-foot desks arranged in a loose grid, bookshelves being used for equipment storage and small tables being used to store books and papers.

The company manufactured clones for several architectures, including the IBM PC standards, Micro Channel, and SPARC. The R&D lab's Systems Development department, managed by Norman Tsai in 1989, was responsible for creating and maintaining the different divisions for each architecture and hiring employees for those divisions. Most employees in Systems Development had majored in electrical engineering with emphasis in computer architecture while in college. The Institute for Information Industry funded research for DTK, as they had done with other computer companies in Taiwan.

Datatech developed its own chipsets in addition to purchasing ones from VLSI and Chips and Technologies. The company's ASIC division comprised 20 employees under the supervision of Dr. Chen Kunnan in 1989. Most employees in this division were trained on the job, although some were also taught at seminars hosted by other ASIC manufacturers. The Electronics Research Service Organization, an agency of the Taiwanese government focused on VLSI circuits, provided funding for this division. Engineers designed the company's chipsets with the use of several EDA tools, including an ECAD Dracula design-rule checker, an ASIX II VLSI checker, a Daisy Logician circuit simulator, a MicroVAX II, and several EGA workstations. Up to four employees shared each workstation. Owing to the company's streamlined nature, new equipment could be delivered in a two weeks, compared to two months for Acer, Datatech's domestic competitor.

Unusual for a company of its stature, Datatech also developed its own BIOS for its IBM PC compatibles. Its first PC BIOS clone was developed in 1985; while second source of such BIOSes had already been developed by companies such as Phoenix Technologies in the United States, Datatech feared that they would be sued out of existence by IBM and so developed its own clean-room implementations in 1985. Although Datatech's fears were later assuaged, quality-assurance supervisor David Wang felt that the continued development of in-house BIOSes afforded the company technical expertise that could be applied to other aspects of their R&D lab, as was the case for the company's ASIC division.

Further expansion (1989–1999)

In the United States, DTK Computer expanded to Texas in 1988, leasing a 17,700-square-foot office in the Alief section of Houston. It later opened up production facilities in Elk Grove Village, Illinois; Norcross, Georgia; Miami, Florida; and New Jersey. The Miami facility in particular was conducive to DTK's sales in Latin America.

DTK was among the first companies to have its computers sold via satellite television in 1991. Satellite Market USA, a satellite-only shopping channel, premiered the Satellite Computer Store in 1991, a program on which DTK and several other computer brands were advertised. In 1992, the company also set up two brick-and-mortar computer stores. These stores did not sell to the end users directly but instead targeted resellers, putting their Grafika multimedia PCs on display as well as accompanying promotional material. A Kansas store was opened in January; another was set up in the Metro Center of Nashville in November. DTK posted revenues of $99 million in the United States in 1994, selling 46,000 equipment units that year.

Duke Liao founded Datatech's Hong Kong subsidiary in 1990, naming it Gemlight Computer. Elsewhere in Asia, Datatech expanded into Japan, India, Dubai, and Mainland China in Shenzhen. Japan was the primary market for Datatech's SPARC workstations. Datatech's Taiwanese operation changed its name to Advance Creative Computer in the mid-1990s and began focusing on PowerPC- and UltraSPARC-based machines as well as Java-based internet appliances. Advance Creative abandoned their PowerPC pursuits in 1996, citing Apple's disposition toward open architectures, but continued developing Java appliances and UltraSPARC workstations. In Europe, meanwhile, DTK established subsidiaries in Germany, Austria, Poland, Hungary, and Moscow.

Decline  (1999–2009)
Gemlight of Hong Kong dissolved sometime in 2001. DTK Computer's offices ceased operations in 2002, filing a certificate of dissolution to the Secretary of State in 2005. DTK's Taiwanese website went down in 2009.

, its Dubai subsidiary is still operational.

Products
 Explanatory notes
 Superserver denotes a server with swappable drive bays.
 Grafika computers, as opposed to their bare-bone counterparts, were fully configured with MS-DOS 5.0 and Windows 3.0 and came shipped with a keyboard and a mouse.

Personal computers

Laptops

Workstations and servers

Notes

Citations

References

 Compare with next archive capture.

External links

 (in )
 (in )

1981 establishments in Taiwan
1986 establishments in California
2001 disestablishments in Hong Kong
2002 disestablishments in California
2009 disestablishments in Taiwan
Companies based in Taipei
Computer companies established in 1981
Computer companies disestablished in 2009
Defunct companies of Taiwan
Defunct computer companies of the United States
Defunct computer hardware companies
Taiwanese brands